Maurice André Raymond Herzog (15 January 191913 December 2012) was a French mountaineer and administrator who was born in Lyon, France. He led the 1950 French Annapurna expedition that first climbed a peak over 8000m, Annapurna, in 1950, and reached the summit with Louis Lachenal. Upon his return, he wrote a best-selling book about the expedition, Annapurna.

Ascent of Annapurna I: a historic exploit 

On 3 June 1950, Herzog and Louis Lachenal became the first climbers in modern history to climb a peak over 8000m when, on the 1950 French Annapurna expedition, they summited the Himalayan mountain Annapurna I, the 10th-highest mountain in the world. The ascent was all the more remarkable because the peak was explored, reconnoitered and climbed all within one season; and was climbed without the use of supplemental oxygen. It is also the only 8000 meter summit that was reached at the first attempt.  Herzog was awarded the 1950 Gold Medal of the Société de Géographie.

The event caused a huge sensation that was only matched when Everest was summited in 1953 by Edmund Hillary and Tenzing Norgay.

The two-week retreat from the peak proved very challenging. Both climbers had opted for light boots for the summit dash. This, combined with Herzog losing his gloves near the summit and a night spent bivouacked in a crevasse on the descent with one sleeping bag for four climbers (Lachenal, Gaston Rébuffat, Lionel Terray, and Herzog) resulted in severe frostbite, with consequent gangrene requiring the expedition doctor to perform emergency amputations in the field. Both summit climbers lost all of their toes and Herzog most of his fingers.

Annapurna I was not climbed again until 1970, when the French north face route was climbed by a British Army expedition led by Colonel Henry Day, simultaneously with an ascent of the south face by an expedition led by British climber Chris Bonington.  The mountain's fourth ascent was not until 1977.

Book
Herzog's account of the expedition was published first in 1951 in French, then in English in 1952 under the title Annapurna.  The book has sold over 11 million copies as of 2000, more than any other mountaineering title. Ending with the stirring line "there are other Annapurnas in the lives of men" (in the context of the book, an exhortation to answer the challenges that life offers), the book gave an account of the expedition that established Herzog's climbing reputation and inspired a generation of mountaineers.

Controversy over his account of the ascent 
Some aspects of Herzog's account of the summit day have been called into question with the publication of other members’ accounts of the expedition, most significantly by a biography of Gaston Rébuffat and the posthumous publication, in 1996, of Lachenal's contemporaneous journals. The 2000 book True Summit: What Really Happened on the Legendary Ascent of Annapurna by David Roberts gives one view of the controversy.

Other achievements 
Herzog went on to become the French Minister of Youth and Sport from 1958 to 1963, and mayor of the alpine town of Chamonix-Mont-Blanc. He was a member of the International Olympic Committee for 25 years from 1970, and has an honorary member after 1995. He was a Grand Officer of the Legion d'Honneur and holder of the Croix de Guerre for military service 1939–45.

Herzog was a 1944 graduate of the French business school HEC Paris.

Publications
 (first American printing)
 (current American edition)

Related books
 (current English edition - original French edition 1961)

References

External links
 Obituary: David Roberts, Pioneering French Climber and Author Maurice Herzog Dies
 https://www.alpinejournal.org.uk/Contents/Contents_1951_files/AJ58%201951%20155-168%20Herzog%20Annapurna.pdf

1919 births
2012 deaths
Sportspeople from Lyon
Mayors of places in Auvergne-Rhône-Alpes
Union for the New Republic politicians
Union of Democrats for the Republic politicians
Government ministers of France
Deputies of the 2nd National Assembly of the French Fifth Republic
Deputies of the 3rd National Assembly of the French Fifth Republic
Deputies of the 4th National Assembly of the French Fifth Republic
Deputies of the 5th National Assembly of the French Fifth Republic
French mountain climbers
International Olympic Committee members
HEC Paris alumni
French Resistance members
French military personnel of World War II
Grand Officiers of the Légion d'honneur
Knights Commander of the Order of Merit of the Federal Republic of Germany